BOCOG may refer to:

Beijing Organizing Committee for the Olympic Games, for the 2008 Summer Olympics
Beijing Organising Committee for the 2022 Olympic and Paralympic Winter Games
Brisbane Organising Committee for the Olympic Games, for the 2032 Summer Olympics